Opeatocerata is a genus of flies in the family Empididae.

Species
O. cooperi Smith, 1991
O. lopesi Smith, 1991
O. melanderi Câmara & Rafael, 2011
O. rubida (Wheeler & Melander, 1901)
O. stubbsi Smith, 1991
O. trilobata Câmara & Rafael, 2011

References

Empidoidea genera
Empididae